Vindhai is a 2015 Indian comedy drama directed by Lawraa and starring Mahendran  and Manishajith.

Synopsis
Karthi and Kavya are arrested by the police for a false accusations who were bought to the police station, there they come across many new faces and people.

Cast

Production
The film is directed by Lawraa, who previously directed Varnam (2011). The film is about a young couple who gets sent to jail because the girl is under age and how they get drawn into other cases which take place at the jail. Former child artistes Mahendran and Manishajith play the lead roles.

Release 
The Times of India gave the film a rating of one out of five stars and wrote that " It seems a good idea on paper but the writing and filmmaking is just abysmal that the only vindhai (wonder) here is that the director managed to find someone this gullible to produce this tripe". A critic from The New Indian Express opined that "The plot enacted within the police station, had the potential to turn into an interesting comic caper, if only the screenplay had been better planned". Maalai Malar criticized the screenplay and the cinematography while praising the performances of Manishajith and M. S. Bhaskar.

References

External links 

Indian comedy-drama films
2010s Tamil-language films
2015 comedy-drama films